The Wiskottens (German: Die Wiskottens) is a 1926 German silent film directed by Arthur Bergen and starring Karl Platen, Gertrud Arnold and Harry Liedtke.

It was based on the 1903 novel of the same title. The film's sets were designed by the art director Max Knaake.

Cast

References

External links

1926 films
Films of the Weimar Republic
Films directed by Arthur Bergen
German silent feature films
National Film films
German black-and-white films